Radec is a small unincorporated community in Riverside County, California, United States. Located roughly 15 miles east by southeast of the city of Temecula, the community of Radec ('Cedar' spelled backwards) is located along Highway 79. Having bought land in the area in 1883, early settler Samuel Tripp set up a post office there.  As of 1893–4, a local directory listed the area as growing honey, hay and stock, but also as having "no commercial interest of any kind." A total of 14 people, mainly farmers and beekeepers, plus a laborer and Tripp, are listed in the directory. The County of Riverside owns a small, non-operational cemetery in Radec.

See also
 List of geographic names derived from anagrams and ananyms

References

 
  

Populated places established in 1883
Unincorporated communities in Riverside County, California
Unincorporated communities in California